Lygophis vanzolinii, Vanzolini's ground snake, is a species of snake in the family Colubridae.  The species is native to Argentina.

References

Lygophis
Snakes of South America
Reptiles of Argentina
Endemic fauna of Argentina
Reptiles described in 1985
Taxa named by James R. Dixon